The Old Woman River is a river in Algoma District of Ontario, Canada, which empties into Old Woman Bay on Lake Superior south of Wawa. It flows through Lake Superior Provincial Park.

The river follows a fault which became a spillway for glacial meltwater following the last ice age. The river's valley has extensive deposits of sand and gravel. At its mouth, the river bends sharply behind a beach berm, that has formed as a result of prevailing westerly winds, which in turn causes lake waves to dam the river's mouth with sand.

Towering cliffs along the bay have been home to peregrine falcons. 	

The name for the bay and river come from a rock formation near the river's mouth that resembles the face of an old woman.

See also 	
List of Ontario rivers

References

External links 

Rivers of Algoma District
Tributaries of Lake Superior